The wildlife of Cambodia is very diverse with at least 162 mammal species, 600 bird species, 176 reptile species (including 89 subspecies), 900 freshwater fish species, 670 invertebrate species, and more than 3000 plant species. A single protected area, Keo Seima Wildlife Sanctuary, is known to support more than 950 total species, including 75 species that are listed as globally threatened on the IUCN Red List. An unknown amount of species remains to be described by science, especially the insect group of butterflies and moths, collectively known as lepidopterans.

Many species in Cambodia, including several endemic ones, are recognized by the IUCN or World Conservation Union as threatened, endangered, or critically endangered due to deforestation and habitat destruction, poaching, the illegal wildlife trade, and farming, fishing, and forestry concessions. Intensive poaching may have already driven Cambodia's national animal, the kouprey, to extinction, wild tigers to extirpation, and Eld's deer, wild water buffaloes and hog deer are at critically low numbers.

Wildlife in Cambodia includes dholes, elephants, deer (sambar, Eld's deer, hog deer and muntjac), wild oxen (banteng and gaur), panthers, bears, and tigers. Cormorants, cranes, ibises, parrots, green peafowl, pheasants, and wild ducks are also found, and species of venomous snakes and constrictors are numerous. Deforestation, mining activities, and unregulated hunting, have diminished the country's wildlife diversity rapidly.

Cambodia also has many endangered species, including Asian elephant, Siamese crocodile, wild water buffalo, and the Germain's silver langur.

Much work is being done in this area to help conserve and protect Cambodia's unique wildlife. Wildlife conservation organizations operating in Cambodia include Conservation International, World Wildlife Fund, the Wildlife Conservation Society, Fauna and Flora International, BirdLife International, Wildlife Alliance, and many others. On 20 December 2016, 163 new animal species were reported in Southeast Asia including one known as the Klingon newt for its resemblance to a Klingon from Star Trek.

Fauna

Some animals native to Cambodia:

Mammals

 Asian black bear
 Asian elephant
 Asian golden cat
 Banteng - endangered
 Binturong - vulnerable
 Clouded leopard
 Dhole
 Douc langur
 Eld's deer
 Gaur - vulnerable
 Hog badger - vulnerable
 Hog deer
 Indian muntjac
 Irrawaddy dolphin
 Kouprey - critically endangered
 Leopard cat
 Lesser false vampire bat
 Marbled cat
 Pileated gibbon - endangered
 Rice-field rat
 Sambar deer
 Serow
 Silvery lutung
 Sun bear
 Wild boar
 Wild water buffalo - endangered

Reptiles
 Asiatic softshell turtle
 Batagur baska
 Bengal monitor
 Blood python
 Burmese python
 Cantor's giant soft-shelled turtle
 Green sea turtle
 Hawksbill turtle
 Indotestudo elongata
 Leatherback sea turtle - vulnerable
 Manouria emys
 Pelochelys cantorii
 Ramphotyphlops braminus
 Reticulated python
 Saltwater crocodile
 Siamese crocodile - critically endangered
 Water monitor
 Golden flying snake
 Asian vine snake
 Long-nosed whip snake
 Many-spotted cat snake
 Mangrove snake
 Dog-toothed cat snake
 Green cat snake
 Kukri snakes
 Radiated ratsnake
 White-lipped pit viper
 Large-eyed pit viper
 Mountain pit viper
 Malayan pit viper
 Russell's viper
 Monocled cobra
 Indochinese spitting cobra
 King cobra - vulnerable
 Banded krait
 Malayan krait
 Red-headed krait
 Red-tailed pipe snake
 Sunbeam snake
 Little file snake
 Elephant trunk snake
 Asian coral snakes
 Tentacled snake
 Sea snake
 Sea krait

Fish
 Asian arowana -
 Barbus sp.
 Botia sp.
 Channa sp. (snakehead fishes)
 Danio sp.
 Labeo sp.
 Mekong freshwater stingray
 Mekong giant catfish -
 Pangasius sp. (catfishes)
 Pangio sp. (kuhli loach)
 Rasbora sp.
 Trichogaster sp.

Birds

Molluscs

Insects
There are several species of insects in Cambodia still undescribed by science.
 Blue ant (an undescribed species of Leptogenys ants)
Only preliminary research has been done on butterflies and moths (lepidopterans) in Cambodia, even though it is an abundant lifeform in the country. No identification literature exists for Cambodia on this group yet.
 Indian moon moth (Actias selene), a common moth across Asia
 Common evening brown butterfly (Melanitis leda), common in Cambodian woodlands

Flora

Cambodia supports more than 3000 identified plant species, many of which are endemic to unique local ecosystems, such as the Tonlé Sap floodplain, forests of the Cardamom and Dâmrei Mountains, and elevated plains.
 Cambodia's national flower is the rumdul flower, officially Mitrella mesnyi.
 The white cheesewood, also known as rumdul, is the official flower of Sisaket Province.

Several plant species in Cambodia are rare and/or endangered:
 Nepenthes bokorensis, one of two rare pitcher plants endemic to Cambodia. Found growing in the Dâmrei Mountains.
 Aquilaria crassna, or chankreussna, is a tree species valued for its perfume which is currently critically endangered.
 Cinnamomum cambodianum a non-scented species of cinnamon tree endemic to Cambodian forests, primarily the Cardamom and Dâmrei Mountains. Perhaps also present in Thailand at the Cambodia-Thailand border region in the northeast. Endangered by illegal logging.

See also

 List of protected areas of Cambodia
 Wildlife of Ratanakiri
 Cardamom Mountains

notes and references

External links
 An online photographic database of Cambodian Marine Species

Biota of Cambodia
Cambodia